The environmental impact of agriculture is the effect that different farming practices have on the ecosystems around them, and how those effects can be traced back to those practices. The environmental impact of agriculture varies widely based on practices employed by farmers and by the scale of practice. Farming communities that try to reduce environmental impacts through modifying their practices will adopt sustainable agriculture practices. The negative impact of agriculture is an old issue that remains a concern even as experts design innovative means to reduce destruction and enhance eco-efficiency. Though some pastoralism is environmentally positive, modern animal agriculture practices tend to be more environmentally destructive than agricultural practices focused on fruits, vegetables and other biomass. The emissions of ammonia from cattle waste continue to raise concerns over environmental pollution.

When evaluating environmental impact, experts use two types of indicators: "means-based", which is based on the farmer's production methods, and "effect-based", which is the impact that farming methods have on the farming system or on emissions to the environment. An example of a means-based indicator would be the quality of groundwater, which is affected by the amount of nitrogen applied to the soil. An indicator reflecting the loss of nitrate to groundwater would be effect-based. The means-based evaluation looks at farmers' practices of agriculture, and the effect-based evaluation considers the actual effects of the agricultural system. For example, the means-based analysis might look at pesticides and fertilization methods that farmers are using, and effect-based analysis would consider how much  is being emitted or what the nitrogen content of the soil is.

The environmental impact of agriculture involves impacts on a variety of different factors: the soil, water, the air, animal and soil variety, people, plants, and the food itself. Agriculture contributes to a number larger of environmental issues that cause environmental degradation including: climate change, deforestation, biodiversity loss, dead zones, genetic engineering, irrigation problems, pollutants, soil degradation, and waste. Because of agriculture's importance to global social and environmental systems, the international community has committed to increasing sustainability of food production as part of Sustainable Development Goal 2: “End hunger, achieve food security and improved nutrition and promote sustainable agriculture". The United Nations Environment Programme's 2021 "Making Peace with Nature" report highlighted agriculture as both a driver and an industry under threat from environmental degradation.

By agricultural practice

Animal agriculture

Irrigation

Pesticides

Plastics

By environmental issue

Climate change

Deforestation

Deforestation is clearing the Earth's forests on a large scale worldwide and resulting in many land damages. One of the causes of deforestation is clearing land for pasture or crops. According to British environmentalist Norman Myers, 5% of deforestation is due to cattle ranching, 19% due to over-heavy logging, 22% due to the growing sector of palm oil plantations, and 54% due to slash-and-burn farming.

Deforestation causes the loss of habitat for millions of species, and is also a driver of climate change. Trees act as a carbon sink: that is, they absorb carbon dioxide, an unwanted greenhouse gas, out of the atmosphere. Removing trees releases carbon dioxide into the atmosphere and leaves behind fewer trees to absorb the increasing amount of carbon dioxide in the air. In this way, deforestation exacerbates climate change.  When trees are removed from forests, the soils tend to dry out because there is no longer shade, and there are not enough trees to assist in the water cycle by returning water vapor back to the environment.  With no trees, landscapes that were once forests can potentially become barren deserts. The tree's roots also help to hold the soil together, so when they are removed, mudslides can also occur. The removal of trees also causes extreme fluctuations in temperature.

In 2000 the United Nations Food and Agriculture Organisation (FAO) found that "the role of population dynamics in a local setting may vary from decisive to negligible," and that deforestation can result from "a combination of population pressure and stagnating economic, social and technological conditions."

Genetic engineering

Pollutants

Soil degradation
Soil degradation is the decline in soil quality that can be a result of many factors, especially from agriculture. Soils hold the majority of the world's biodiversity, and healthy soils are essential for food production and adequate water supply. Common attributes of soil degradation can be salting, waterlogging, compaction, pesticide contamination, a decline in soil structure quality, loss of fertility, changes in soil acidity, alkalinity, salinity, and erosion. Soil erosion is the wearing away of topsoil by water, wind, or farming activities. Topsoil is very fertile, which makes it valuable to farmers growing crops. Soil degradation also has a huge impact on biological degradation, which affects the microbial community of the soil and can alter nutrient cycling, pest and disease control, and chemical transformation properties of the soil.

Tillage erosion

Waste 
Plasticulture is the use of plastic mulch in agriculture. Farmers use plastic sheets as mulch to cover 50-70% of the soil and allow them to use drip irrigation systems to have better control over soil nutrients and moisture. Rain is not required in this system, and farms that use plasticulture are built to encourage the fastest runoff of rain. The use of pesticides with plasticulture allows pesticides to be transported easier in the surface runoff towards wetlands or tidal creeks. The runoff from pesticides and chemicals in the plastic can cause serious deformations and death in shellfish as the runoff carries the chemicals toward the oceans.

In addition to the increased runoff that results from plasticulture, there is also the problem of the increased amount of waste from the plastic mulch itself. The use of plastic mulch for vegetables, strawberries, and other row and orchard crops exceeds 110 million pounds annually in the United States. Most plastic ends up in the landfill, although there are other disposal options such as disking mulches into the soil, on-site burying, on-site storage, reuse, recycling, and incineration. The incineration and recycling options are complicated by the variety of the types of plastics that are used and by the geographic dispersal of the plastics. Plastics also contain stabilizers and dyes as well as heavy metals, which limits the number of products that can be recycled. Research is continually being conducted on creating biodegradable or photodegradable mulches. While there has been a minor success with this, there is also the problem of how long the plastic takes to degrade, as many biodegradable products take a long time to break down.

Issues by region
The environmental impact of agriculture can vary depending on the region as well as the type of agriculture production method that is being used. Listed below are some specific environmental issues in various different regions around the world.

Hedgerow removal in the United Kingdom.
Soil salinisation, especially in Australia.
Phosphate mining in Nauru
Methane emissions from livestock in New Zealand. See Climate change in New Zealand.
Environmentalists attribute the hypoxic zone in the Gulf of Mexico as being encouraged by nitrogen fertilization of the algae bloom.
Coupled systems from agricultural trade leading to regional effects from cascading effects and spillover systems. Environmental factor (Socioeconomic Drivers Section)

Sustainable agriculture

Sustainable agriculture is the idea that agriculture should occur in a way such that we can continue to produce what is necessary without infringing on the ability for future generations to do the same.

The exponential population increase in recent decades has increased the practice of agricultural land conversion to meet the demand for food which in turn has increased the effects on the environment. The global population is still increasing and will eventually stabilize, as some critics doubt that food production, due to lower yields from global warming, can support the global population.

Agriculture can have negative effects on biodiversity as well. Organic farming is a multifaceted sustainable agriculture set of practices that can have a lower impact on the environment at a small scale. However, in most cases organic farming results in lower yields in terms of production per unit area. Therefore, widespread adoption of organic agriculture will require additional land to be cleared and water resources extracted to meet the same level of production. A European meta-analysis found that organic farms tended to have higher soil organic matter content and lower nutrient losses (nitrogen leaching, nitrous oxide emissions, and ammonia emissions) per unit of field area but higher ammonia emissions, nitrogen leaching and nitrous oxide emissions per product unit.  It is believed by many that conventional farming systems cause less rich biodiversity than organic systems. Organic farming has shown to have on average 30% higher species richness than conventional farming. Organic systems on average also have 50% more organisms. This data has some issues because there were several results that showed a negative effect on these things when in an organic farming system. The opposition to organic agriculture believes that these negatives are an issue with the organic farming system. What began as a small scale, environmentally conscious practice has now become just as industrialized as conventional agriculture. This industrialization can lead to the issues shown above such as climate change, and deforestation.

Regenerative agriculture

Techniques

Conservation tillage 

Conservation tillage is an alternative tillage method for farming which is more sustainable for the soil and surrounding ecosystem. This is done by allowing the residue of the previous harvest's crops to remain in the soil before tilling for the next crop. Conservation tillage has shown to improve many things such as soil moisture retention, and reduce erosion. Some disadvantages are the fact that more expensive equipment is needed for this process, more pesticides will need to be used, and the positive effects take a long time to be visible. The barriers of instantiating a conservation tillage policy are that farmers are reluctant to change their methods, and would protest a more expensive, and time-consuming method of tillage than the conventional one they are used to.

Biological pest control

See also

 Agroecology
 Agricultural pollution
 Agro-hydro-salinity model (for environmental impacts of irrigated agriculture)
 Cultured meat
 Digital Product Passport
 Ethical eating
 Fermentation
 Meat analogue
 Environmental effects of soybean imports to EU
 Single cell protein
 Stranded assets in the agriculture and forestry sector
 Concentrated animal feeding operations
 List of environmental issues
 Habitat
 Holistic management
 Livestock's Long Shadow – Environmental Issues and Options
  Report by the Food and Agriculture Organization of the United Nations Principles of Organic Agriculture
 Research Institute for Organic Agriculture
 Stock-free agriculture
 Tillage erosion

References

Works cited
 
 .

Further reading
Miller, G. T., & Spoolman, S. (2012). Environmental science. Cengage Learning.  

External links

Holistic Management International
Environmental Issues in Animal Agriculture – Choices'' magazine article
Waterlog.info Website with free articles and software on environmental impacts of irrigated agriculture like waterlogging and salinization
Environmental Planning on Livestock and Poultry Operations  describes several different planning processes that can be used on farms. It also includes links to several webcasts. Part of the Livestock and Poultry Environmental Learning Center